Craig W. Brandt (born August 28, 1968 in Quincy, California) is an American politician and a Republican member of the New Mexico Senate representing District 40 since January 15, 2013.

Education
Brandt earned his BA from Oklahoma Baptist University.

Elections
Before his election to the New Mexico state Senate, Brandt served on the  Rio Rancho School Board.

2012 With District 40 incumbent Republican Senator William Burt redistricted to District 33, Brandt ran in the June 5, 2012 Republican Primary, winning with 1,363 votes (62.2%) and won the November 6, 2012 General election with 9,982 votes (55.3%) against Democratic nominee Linda Allison.

References

External links
Official page at the New Mexico Legislature
Campaign site

Craig Brandt at Ballotpedia
Craig W. Brandt at OpenSecrets

1968 births
Living people
Republican Party New Mexico state senators
Oklahoma Baptist University alumni
People from Quincy, California
People from Rio Rancho, New Mexico
21st-century American politicians